The PowerTrike Light is a German ultralight trike and powered parachute, designed and produced by PowerTrike of Mackenbach. The aircraft is supplied as a complete ready-to-fly-aircraft.

The same basic airframe is used to mount either a hang glider or paraglider wing and is known as the Light-Delta and Light-Para, respectively, in those configurations.

As of 2014 the design is no longer indicated as available on the company website.

Design and development
It features a cable-braced hang glider-style high-wing, weight-shift controls, a single-seat open cockpit without a cockpit fairing, tricycle landing gear and a single engine in pusher configuration.

The aircraft is made from bolted-together aluminum tubing, with its double surface wing covered in Dacron sailcloth. Its  span Bautek Pico L wing is supported by a single tube-type kingpost and uses an "A" frame weight-shift control bar. The powerplant is the single cylinder, air-cooled, two-stroke,  Hirth F33 engine or the Briggs & Stratton twin cylinder, air-cooled, four-stroke  engine.

A number of different wings can be fitted to the basic carriage, including the standard  area Bautek Bico and the  area Bautek Pico L, which is only used with the higher output Briggs & Stratton powerplant. Any hang glider wing with a sufficient gross weight capacity can also be used. The aircraft can easily be disassembled and folded to fit inside an automobile, with the wing carried on a roof rack.

Operational history
The PowerTrike Light has proven popular with hang glider pilots transitioning to powered flying because they can use their existing hang glider wing mounted on the Light.

Variants
Light-Delta
Version with hang glider wing
Light-Para
Version with paraglider wing

Specifications (Light with Bautek Pico L wing)

References

External links
Official website

2000s German sport aircraft
2000s German ultralight aircraft
Single-engined pusher aircraft
Ultralight trikes
Powered parachutes